Michael Constantine Lemos (born May 1955) is a London-based Greek heir, who inherited the shipping company CM Lemos from his father Constantinos Lemos.

Michael Constantine Lemos was born in May 1955.

Lemos and his two sisters inherited £1.1 billion from their father. In the 2014 Sunday Times Rich List, Lemos had a net worth of £605 million.

See also
Lemos family

References 

1955 births
Living people
Greek businesspeople in shipping
Michael